Richard Zander (born March 3, 1964) is a German former competitive figure skater. He is a two-time German national champion.

Zander was born in Portland, Oregon, United States to German parents. In 1980, he moved to Germany to focus on figure skating training. He became German champion in 1987 and 1989. His coach was Karin Doherty. He represented the club EC Oberstdorf and competed at the 1988 Winter Olympics.

Results

References

 German newspapers 1988
 result lists ISU and DEU

Navigation

1964 births
Living people
German male single skaters
Figure skaters at the 1988 Winter Olympics
Olympic figure skaters of West Germany
Sportspeople from Portland, Oregon
American people of German descent